Francesco Gazo (born 29 February 1992) is an Italian footballer who plays as a midfielder for Italian club Città di Varese.

Club career
Born in Varese, Lombardy, Gazo started his career at Azzate Calcio Mornago and then A.S. Varese 1910. In August 2009 he was signed by another Lombard club AlbinoLeffe of Serie B, re-joining former teammate Nicholas Allievi. He spent 2 seasons in the reserve team from 2009 to 2011. In 2011, he was signed by Lega Pro Prima Divisione club Pro Vercelli, however he was a player of the reserve team as overage player. On 13 January 2012 he was signed by Prato.

Gazo returned to AlbinoLeffe in 2012, which the club relegated to the Prime Divisione. The club failed to win the promotion playoffs in 2014.

On 13 July 2019, he joined Serie D club Seregno.

References

External links
 AIC profile (data by football.it) 
 

1992 births
Sportspeople from Varese
Living people
Italian footballers
Association football midfielders
S.S.D. Varese Calcio players
U.C. AlbinoLeffe players
F.C. Pro Vercelli 1892 players
A.C. Prato players
Aurora Pro Patria 1919 players
U.S. 1913 Seregno Calcio players
A.S.D. Città di Varese players
Serie C players
Serie D players
Footballers from Lombardy